Middleboro is an unincorporated community in Wayne Township, Wayne County, Indiana near the city of Richmond.

Features
Middleboro Methodist Church is located on State Road 227 at the curve in Middleboro.
The only streets in Middleboro are State Road 227, Porterfield Road, Hollandsburg Road, and three small side streets.

Geography
Middleboro is located at 39°53'38" North, 84°49'55" West (39.893889, -84.831944) along State Road 227, about five miles northeast of Richmond.

References

External links

 Middleboro, Indiana

Unincorporated communities in Wayne County, Indiana
Unincorporated communities in Indiana

vo:Alto (Indiana)